Battambang is the capital of Battambang Province and the third largest city in Cambodia.

Founded in the 11th century by the Khmer Empire, Battambang is the leading rice-producing province of the country. For nearly 100 years it was a major commercial hub and provincial capital of Siamese province of Inner Cambodia (1795-1907), though it was always populated by Khmer, with some ethnic Vietnamese, Lao, Thai and Chinese. Battambang remains the hub of Cambodia's northwest, connecting the region with Phnom Penh and Thailand.

The city is situated on the Sangkae River, a tranquil, small body of water that winds its way picturesquely through Battambang Province. As with much of Cambodia, French Colonial architecture is a notable aspect of the city, with some of the best-preserved examples in the country. Now the government and Ministry of Culture and Fine Art are preparing documents to nominate The Old Town of Battambang in the list of UNESCO world heritage site along with The Old Town of Kampot and The Old Town of Kratie since 2017.

History

Battambang was established as an important trading city with around 2,500 residents in the 18th century. The population was centred along a single road parallel to the Sangkae River (Stung Sangkae). In 1795 Siam (modern-day Thailand) annexed much of north western Cambodia including the current provinces of Banteay Meanchey, Battambang, Oddar Meanchey, Pailin, and Siem Reap into the province of Inner Cambodia. The Siamese ruled Battambang as a provincial capital through the Thai-speaking Khmer Abhaiwongse family, a branch of the Khmer royal family, which governed for six generations until 1907 when the province was ceded to the French to be reunited with Cambodia as part of the French Indochina colony.

Following colonization by the French, an urban layout was developed which resulted in an enlarged French colonial town. This first attempt at modernization resulted in well-defined streets laid in a grid pattern, building of urban structures and three main streets parallel to the Sangkae River, and the linking of both banks by the construction of two bridges in 1917. Military and prison facilities were also erected. Nineteen years later, a second urban development plan was implemented with a newly constructed railway linking Battambang to Phnom Penh. The urban structures were extended to the west of the town creating urban hubs oriented around the railway station. The large residential villas and public buildings built during this period of French development significantly changed the landscape of the previously remote city. A subsequent third urban development plan for Battambang involved the north, east and south of the city. This vast undertaking, which required long-term planning to integrate all of the previous work, resulted in a modern provincial capital that was by far the most developed region of Cambodia outside of Phnom Penh.

Much later, more infrastructure and public facilities were built under the modernization program of the Cambodian government led by Prince Sihanouk. Several provincial departments, a court house and other public buildings were added on both sides of the river. Textile and garment factories were built by French and Chinese investors, the Battambang Airport was constructed, and the railway line was extended to the Thai border at Poipet. To serve the cultural needs of the population, numerous schools and a university were built as well as a sports centre, museum and an exhibition hall.

Climate

Attractions

Kamping Puoy Lake

It is famous for its giant lotus flowers whose fiber is spun and weaved to make a new organic fabric. These activities employ more than 20 underprivileged women around the lake.

Baset Temple
Was built during the reign of King Suryavarman I (1002–1050) and is located on a hill at Baset village, Ta Pun commune  from the provincial town. Baset temple adapts the architecture of the 11th century and was built between 1036 and 1042. The pond never dries up even in the dry season.

Wat Ek Phnom

Adapts the architecture of the 11th century and was built in 1027 during the reign of King Suryavarman I (1002–1050). It is located at Piem Ek commune  from the provincial town.

Prasat Banan (Phnom Banan)

Adapts the architecture of the mid-11th century and the end of the 12th century; the temple was first built by King Dharanindravarman II (1050–1066) and was completed in its final form by the King Jayavarman VII (1181–1220). The temple is located on the top of a mountain approximately  located at Koh Tey 2 commune, Banan District. It can be reached by traveling  from the provincial town by the provincial road No 155, which runs parallel to the Sangker River. In the valley, there is Ku Teuk and two main natural wells, namely: Bit Meas and Chhung or Chhung Achey.

Norry (Bamboo Train)

The Norry, or bamboo train, runs  from Prasat Banan to Chhoeuteal commune. Previously located on actual railway tracks outside the city, the bamboo train was relocated in 2017 to make way for the resumption of railway traffic.

Prasat Snung

According to the style at the gate, the temple is similar to other temples in the 12th century. Behind the temple, there is another new temple being built.

Phnom Sampov

On the top of Sam Puoy mountain, there is a temple and three natural wells, namely Pkar Slar, Lo Khuon and Ak Sopheak. Next to Sam Puoy mountain, there are some mountains, and natural sites like Phnom Trung Moan, Phnom Trung Tea and Phnom Neang Rum Say Sork. These mountains relate to the Cambodia folk legend of Reach Kol Neang Rum Say Sork.

Sek Sak Resort

A natural resort which has been popular since before the civil war, Sek Sak stretches along the river bank with plants, trees and bamboo stretching  in length. Tourists can also visit other attractive sites like Po Pus Pich Chen Da Dong Tong and Sa Ang speak, the pre-history site five kilometers (3.1 mi) to six kilometers (3.75 mi) away. Sek Sak is located in Treng commune, Rotanak Mondul District  from the provincial town of Battambang along the National Road No 57, the former National Road No 10.

Battambang Circus (Phare Ponleu Selpak)

The shows include a range of circus disciplines including acrobatics, juggling, aerial work, clowning, tightrope walking and aqua-balance. It gives performances every Monday and Thursday evening. The shows are put on by students from the NGO arts school, Phare Ponleu Selpak that helps disadvantaged children and young people escape from situations connected with poverty such as begging or trafficking and to get an education, both in normal public school and in the arts.

Bahá'í House of Worship

Inaugurated in 2017, it is notable for being one of the first Bahá'í temples to be built to serve a single locality, and the first local Bahá'í house of worship to be constructed. The round, nine-sided edifice features a central dome and spire, and winged parapets that have been called reminiscent of Phnom Penh's Chaktomuk Conference Hall.

Transportation
Battambang is generally accessible via road and rail. There are buses that ply between the city and Bangkok, Phnom Penh and Siem Reap. The railway line plying between Phnom Penh and Poipet has been rehabilitated, allowing access via Battambang Royal railway station.

Battambang Airport was reserved for military uses, but opened with limited services for small airplanes and helicopters in 2018.

There is also (except during the lowest water levels of the dry season) a daily boat connection between Battambang and Siem Reap via the Sangkae River. Since the buses are faster and cheaper, the scenic trip is nowadays used mainly by tourists and some locals who live along the river.

Twin towns – sister cities
 Stockton, California, USA

Notable people
Sar Kheng - Minister of the Interior and Deputy Prime Minister
Kalyanee Mam - filmmaker
Vann Nath - painter, artist, writer, and human rights activist
Sopheap Pich - sculptor and artist
Arn Chorn-Pond - human rights activist
Pen Ran - musician (vocalist/songwriter)
Ros Serey Sothea - musician (vocalist) ("The Golden Voice Queen Of Cambodia")

Although the legendary Cambodian maestro Sinn Sisamouth was not born in Battambang, he did live there for some of his childhood.

References

Further reading

 Analyzing Development Issues Trainees, ADI Team, and Cooperation Committee for Cambodia. Labour Migration to Thailand and the Thai-Cambodian Border Recent Trends in Four Villages of Battambang Province. Small-scale research report. [Phnom Penh?]: Cooperation Committee for Cambodia, 2003.
 Catalla, Rebecca F. Crossing Borders, Crossing Norms Vulnerability and Coping in Battambang Province. SCVCS report, #5. Phnom Penh, Cambodia: UNICEF/AFSC, 2000. 
 Kassie, Alebachew, and Nguon Sokunthea. Credit and Landlessness Impact of Credit Access on Landlessness in Cheung Prey and Battambang Districts. Phnom Penh: Oxfam GB Cambodia Land Study Project, 2000.
 Mourer, Cécile, and Roland Mourer. The Prehistoric Industry of Laang Spean, Province of Battambang, Cambodia. Sydney: Australasian Medical Pub, 1970.
 Robinson, Court, Suphāng Čhanthawānit, and Lekha Nou. Rupture and Return Repatriation, Displacement, and Reintegration in Battambang Province, Cambodia. Bangkok: The Center, 1994. 
 Grant Ross, Helen. Battambang = Pâtṭaṃpaṅ = Bad Dambaung = Le bâton perdu : histoire d'une ville. Phnom Penh, Cambodge: 3DGraphics Pub, 2003.  in French and Khmer
 Tūc, Jhuaṅ. Battambang During the Time of the Lord Governor. Phnom Penh: Cedoreck, 1994.
 Vinary, Vonn. "All Our Livelihoods Are Dead" Landlessness and Aquatic Resources in Battambang Province. [Phnom Penh]: Oxfam GB Cambodia Land Study Project, 2000.
 Wallgren, Pia, and Ray Sano. Report on the Reconciliation Areas Based on in-Depth Interviews Conducted in Six Villages in Battambang, Banteay Meanchey and Siem Reap Provinces. Phnom Penh: UNDP/CARERE, 2000.

External links

Battambang - The Rice Bowl of Cambodia (Official Website of the Provincial Town Battambang on www.battambang-town.gov.kh) 
Phnom Bannon Hill Temple

Provincial capitals in Cambodia
Cities in Cambodia
Battambang District

km:ក្រុងបាត់ដំបង